USS Moccasin may refer to more than one United States Navy ship:

, a tug in commission from 1864 to 1865 that was assigned to the North Atlantic Blockading Squadron during the American Civil War
, a refrigerated cargo ship in commission from 1918 to 1919

United States Navy ship names